Kensico Cemetery, located in Valhalla, Westchester County, New York was founded in 1889, when many New York City cemeteries were becoming full, and rural cemeteries were being created near the railroads that served the city. Initially , it was expanded to 600 acres (2.4 km²) in 1905, but reduced to 461 acres (1.9 km²) in 1912, when a portion was sold to the neighboring Gate of Heaven Cemetery.

Many entertainment figures of the early twentieth century, including the Russian-born Sergei Rachmaninoff, were buried here. The cemetery has a special section for members of the Actors' Fund of America and the National Vaudeville Association, some of whom died in abject poverty.

The cemetery contains four Commonwealth war graves, of three Canadian Army soldiers of World War I and a repatriated American Royal Air Force airman of World War II.

As of December 2021, eight Major League Baseball players are buried here, including Baseball Hall of Fame inductee Lou Gehrig.

Sharon Gardens is a  section of Kensico Cemetery, which was created in 1953 for Jewish burials.

Notable interments in Kensico division

 Virginia Admiral (1915–2000), painter and poet, mother of Robert De Niro
 Hadji Ali (c. 1887-92–1937), vaudeville performance artist
 Elizabeth Akers Allen (1832–1911), author and poet
 Glenn Anders (1889–1981), American actor
 Edward Franklin Albee II (1857–1930), Vaudeville impresario
 John Emory Andrus (1841–1934), mayor of Yonkers, New York, and U.S. Congressman
 Peter Arno (1904–1968), cartoonist
 Anne Bancroft (1931–2005), American actress
 Wendy Barrie (1912–1978), actress
 Ed Barrow (1868–1953), baseball manager and executive
 Marion Bauer (1882–1955), American composer
 Malcolm Lee Beggs (1907–1956) actor
 Henri Bendel (1868–1936), fashion designer, creator of the Bendel bonnet
 Vivian Blaine (1921–1995), actress and singer
 William Blaisdell (1865–1931) Actor. Plot: Actors' Fund
 Ralph Albert Blakelock (1847–1919), Romanticist painter
 Patras Bokhari (1898–1958), Pakistani humorist writer
 Paul Bonwit (1862–1939), founder of Bonwit Teller department store
 Evangeline Booth (1865–1950), evangelist, daughter of Salvation Army founder, fourth General of The Salvation Army
 Herbert Booth (1862–1926), songwriter, son of Salvation Army founder
 Sully Boyar (Irvin) (1923–2001), actor
 Martin Bregman (1926–2018), film producer
 Russ Brown (1892–1964), actor
 Billie Burke (1884–1970), actress
 Henry Burr (1882–1941), Canadian singer
 William J. Butler (1860–1927), Irish silent film actor

 Cheng Chui Ping (1949–2014), 'Snakehead', human smuggler
 Andy Coakley (1882–1963), baseball player
 Frank Conroy (1890–1964), British film and stage actor
 Bigelow Cooper, (1867–1953) actor
 Harry Cooper (1904–2000), golfer
 Frederick E. Crane (1869–1947), Chief Judge of the NY Court of Appeals
 Cheryl Crawford (1902–1986), theatrical producer
 Milton Cross (1897–1975), radio announcer
 Edward W. Curley (1873–1940), U.S. Congressman
 George Ticknor Curtis (1812–1894), author, writer, historian and lawyer
 Harry Davenport (1866–1949), actor
 Olive Deering (1918–1986), actress
 William Wallace Denslow (1856–1915), illustrator
 Robert De Niro, Sr., (1922—1993), artist, father of actor Robert De Niro
 Peter DeRose, (1900–1953), Hall of Fame composer
 Elliott Dexter (1870–1941), film and stage actor
 Lew Dockstader (1856–1924), vaudeville comedian.
 Luigi Palma di Cesnola, (1832–1904) Civil War Congressional Medal of Honor Recipient
 Arthur Donaldson (actor) (1869–1955), stage and screen actor
 Tommy Dorsey (1905–1956), swing–era trombonist
 J. Gordon Edwards (1867–1925), silent film director
 Sherman Edwards (1919–1981), Tony-Award winning composer and songwriter
 Angna Enters (1897–1989), entertainer
 Judith Evelyn (1909–1967), stage actress
 Geraldine Farrar (1882–1967), opera singer
 Sid Farrar (1859–1935), Major League baseball player, father of Geraldine Farrar
 Emanuel Feuermann (1902–1942), master cellist
 Sylvia Fine (1913–1991) lyricist, composer, and producer, and the wife of the comedian Danny Kaye
 Ezio Flagello (1931–2009) opera singer
 Gloria Foster (1933–2001) actress
 Harry Frazee (1880–1929), owner of the Boston Red Sox
 Lou Gehrig (1903–1941), Hall of Fame baseball player
 Roy J. Glauber (1925–2018), Nobel Laureate-Physics
 Billy Golden (1858–1926), blackface comic and singer
 Ulu Grosbard (1929–2012) motion picture and stage director, producer
 Marion Harris (1896–1944), singer
 Valerie Jill Haworth  (1945–2011), British actress
 Mrs. Julian Heath (1863–1932),  radio personality
 Grace Henderson (1860–1944), actress
 Gustave Herter (1830–1898), furniture maker and interior decorator
 Al Hodge (1912–1979), actor
 May Irwin (1862–1938), comedian
 Danny Kaye (1911–1987), comedic actor
 Guy Kibbee (1882–1956), actor
 Joseph Kilgour (1863–1933), Canadian actor
 Ruth Laredo (1937–2005), pianist
 William Van Duzer Lawrence (1842–1927), founder of Sarah Lawrence College
 Herbert H. Lehman (1878–1963), politician
 Jeffreys Lewis (abt. 1852–1926), actress
 Joseph J. Little (1841–1913), U.S. Representative from New York
 Cissie Loftus (1876–1943), Scottish–born actress, singer, comedian and vaudevillian
 Dorothy Loudon (1933–2003), Tony Award winning actress
 Mario Majeroni (1870–1931), Italian-born actor, nephew of Adelaide Ristori
 Tommy Manville (1894–1967), heir to the Johns Manville asbestos fortune
 Jack McGowan (1894–1977), Broadway writer, performer, and producer
 Claudia McNeil (1917–1993), actress
 Herman A. Metz (1867–1934), U.S. Congressman
 Anna Moffo (1932–2006), soprano singer
 William Muldoon (1852–1933), wrestler
 Allan Nevins (1890–1971), historian and journalist
 Anne Nichols (1891–1966), playwright and screenwriter
 Carlotta Nillson (1876–1951), actress
 Caroline Love Goodwin O'Day (1875–1943), United States Representative from New York
 Eulace Peacock (1914–1996), track and field athlete
 Ann Pennington (1893–1971), Ziegfeld actress
 David Graham Phillips (1867–1911), journalist and novelist
 Jesse S. Phillips (1871–1954), lawyer, assemblyman, State Insurance Superintendent, and insurance executive
 Harriet Quimby (1875–1912), pioneer aviator
 Sergei Rachmaninoff (1873–1943), composer, pianist, and conductor
 Ayn Rand (1905–1982), author, philosopher, playwright and screenwriter
 Jacob Ruppert (1867–1939), owner of the New York Yankees
 Soupy Sales (1926–2009), comedian
 David Sarnoff (1891–1971), broadcaster and head of RCA
 Fritzi Scheff (1879–1954), actress and vocalist
 Gordon Scott (1926–2007), actor
 Peri Schwartz (1951–2021), artist
 Gil Scott-Heron (1949–2011) singer and musician
 Ann Shoemaker (1891–1978), actress
 Richard B. Shull (1929–1999), actor
 Ivan F. Simpson (1875–1951), Scottish actor
 Leo Singer (1877–1950), manager of the Singer Midgets vaudeville group
 Alison Skipworth (1863–1952), English actress
 Alfred Holland Smith (1863–1924), president of the New York Central Railroad
 Howard Smith (1893–1968), character actor
 Mildred Joanne Smith (1921–2015), actress and educator
 Peter Moore Speer (1862–1933), U.S. Congressman
 Ellsworth Milton Statler (1863–1928), hotelier
 Henry Stephenson (1871–1956), actor
 Max Stern (businessman) (1898–1982), entrepreneur and philanthropist
 Lewis Stone (1879–1953), actor
 Oscar W. Swift (1869–1940), U.S. Congressman
 Fay Templeton (1865–1939), actress
 Gertrude Thanhouser (1880–1951), actress
 Benjamin I. Taylor (1877–1946), U.S. Congressman
 Deems Taylor (1885–1966), composer and journalist
 Victoria Tolbert (1916–1997), First Lady of Liberia
 Wen-Ying Tsai (1928–2013), cybernetic sculptor
 William L. Ward (1856–1933), U.S. Congressman
 Charles Weidman (1901–1975), dancer and choreographer
 James E. West (1876–1948), first Chief Scout Executive of the Boy Scouts of America
 Spencer Wishart (1889–1914), racecar driver
 William B. Williams (1923–1986), disc jockey
 John North Willys (1873–1935), automobile manufacturer
 Charles E. Wilson (1886–1972), president of General Electric
 Francis Wilson (1854–1935), actor
 Blanche Yurka (1887–1974), theatre and film actress
 Herbert Zelenko (1906–1979), U.S. Congressman
 Florenz Ziegfeld (1869–1932), producer of the Ziegfeld Follies

Notable interments in Sharon Gardens division
 Paddy Chayefsky (1923–1981), screenwriter, winner of three Academy Awards
 Fred Friendly (1915–1998), broadcaster
 Philip Gips (1931–2019), film poster artist
 Gilbert Gottfried (1955–2022), comedian
 Robert Merrill (1917–2004), baritone, Metropolitan opera star
 Murray Saltzman (1929–2010), rabbi, civil rights leader
 Beverly Sills (1929–2007), operatic soprano
 Lee Wallace, (1930–2020), actor
 Elie Wiesel (1928–2016), writer, Holocaust survivor

Image gallery

References

External links 
 Kensico Cemetery homepage
 

Cemeteries in Westchester County, New York
Mount Pleasant, New York
1889 establishments in New York (state)
Actors Fund of America